Manhattan Nocturne is an album by the saxophonist Charles McPherson, recorded in 1997 and released on the Arabesque label the following year.

Reception

The AllMusic review by Michael G. Nastos stated: "This CD by McPherson is his best of the '70s, '80s, and '90s, and he's done some very good ones. The combination of seasoned, thinking musicians and excellent material, played to the hilt, is too good a combination for any jazz lover to resist".

Track listing
All compositions by Charles McPherson except where noted
 "Evidence" (Thelonious Monk) – 6:10
 "You're My Thrill" (Jay Gorney, Sidney Clare) – 8:13
 "Morning Dance" – 6:39
 "Primal Urge" – 8:15
 "Blue 'n' Boogie" (Dizzy Gillespie, Frank Paparelli) – 7:07
 "How Deep Is the Ocean?" (Irving Berlin) – 10:12
 "Manhattan Nocturne" – 7:08
 "Fire Dance" – 6:02

Personnel
 Charles McPherson – alto saxophone
 Mulgrew Miller – piano
 Ray Drummond – double bass
 Victor Lewis – drums
 Bobby Sanabria – percussion

References

Arabesque Records albums
Charles McPherson (musician) albums
1998 albums